Kurigram Sadar is an upazila of Kurigram District in the Division of Rangpur, Bangladesh.

Geography
It has a total area 276.45 km2.

Demographics

According to the 2011 Bangladesh census, Kurigram Sadar Upazila had 72,592 households and a population of 312,408, 25.9% of whom lived in urban areas. 11.1% of the population was under the age of 5. The literacy rate (age 7 and over) was 46.1%, compared to the national average of 51.8%.

Administration
Kurigram Sadar Upazila is divided into Kurigram Municipality and eight union parishads: Belgacha, Bhogdanga, Ghogadhoh, Holokhana, Jatrapur, Kanthalbari, Mogolbasa, and Panchgachi. The union parishads are subdivided into 78 mauzas and 266 villages.

Kurigram Municipality is subdivided into 9 wards and 106 mahallas.

Education
 Kurigram Government College
 Kurigram Govt. Womens' College
 Mojida Degree College
 Kurigram Govt. High School
 Kurigram Govt. Girls' High School
 Shuvesscha tutorial Homes, Mollah para, Kurigram
 Mogalbasa Bilateral High School

See also
Upazilas of Bangladesh
Districts of Bangladesh
Divisions of Bangladesh

References

Upazilas of Kurigram District